John Edmeads (born ? at Chertsey in Surrey; died July 1802 at Staines) was an English cricketer who played for Chertsey Cricket Club, Surrey and All-England.

Edmeads seems to have begun his career in the 1750s and played until 1779, making 19 known first-class appearances from the beginning of the statistical record in 1772, by when his best years were probably behind him.  He was a noted batsman and fielder.

He kept Simplemarsh Farm in the Chertsey parish; the farm was in his family for over 200 years.

References

1802 deaths
English cricketers
Surrey cricketers
English cricketers of 1701 to 1786
Hampshire cricketers
Year of birth unknown
Non-international England cricketers
Chertsey cricketers
Sportspeople from Chertsey